Amelia is a ghost town in Mason County, in the U.S. state of Washington.

A post office called Amelia was established in 1895, and remained in operation until 1901. Amelia Edmonds, an early postmaster, gave the community her name.

References

Ghost towns in Washington (state)
Geography of Mason County, Washington